was a Japanese architect and professor.

Biography 
Kenji Imai went to Waseda University in Tokyo and graduated with a degree in Architecture. He travelled to the USSR, Scandinavia, Italy and Spain in 1926. He met Walter Gropius, Le Corbusier, Ernst May and others, which asserted an influence on his way of thinking and his architectural style. Like Togo Murano and Takamasa Yoshizaka who also trained at Waseda University, Imai had a style which can be categorized as Expressionist. Impressed with the works of Antoni Gaudi, he proceeded to promote him in Japan and elsewhere.

He also introduced the work of the Austrian mystic, Rudolf Steiner to Japan.

In 1948 his wife Maria Shimko died and he converted to Catholicism.

Works

 Library at Waseda University (1925)
Twenty-Six Martyrs Museum and Monument (1962)
Tokado Imperial Palace (1966)

References

1895 births
1987 deaths
Waseda University alumni
Japanese architects